Mohammad Jamshidabadi is an Iranian boxer. He competed in the men's heavyweight at the 1948 Summer Olympics.

1948 Olympic results
Below is the record of Mohammad Jamshidabadi, an Iranian heavyweight boxer who competed at the 1948 London Olympics:

 Round of 32: bye
 Round of 16: lost to Gunnar Nilsson (Sweden) by disqualification in the second round

References

External links
 

Boxers at the 1948 Summer Olympics
Iranian male boxers
Olympic boxers of Iran
Possibly living people
Year of birth missing
Heavyweight boxers